Mir is a Russian card payment system for electronic fund transfers established by the Central Bank of Russia under a law adopted on 1 May 2017. Mir does not itself issue cards, extend credit or set rates and fees for consumers; rather, Mir provides financial institutions with Mir-branded payment products that they then use to offer credit, debit, or other programs to their customers. The development and implementation of Mir was spurred by the imposition of international sanctions against Russia in 2014 to circumnavigate the reliance on the likes of Visa and Mastercard, which were blocked in Russia at the time.

History
Mir, as an idea, was born out of a series of joint initiatives between the Central Bank of Russia and the World Bank in the mid-2000s that aimed to create a framework of an autonomous payment processing system inside the Russian Federation. While development was nearing completion, the Global Financial Crisis put further activity on indefinite hold.

Mir cards were initially accepted mostly by Russia-based companies, such as Aeroflot and Russian Railways, but it gradually became popular among foreign companies with operations in Russia. In April 2016, AliExpress became the first foreign company to accept Mir as a form of payment within the Russian Federation, and McDonald's was the first U.S. company to accept it three months later.

The system was developed by Belgian digital payments company OpenWay, which created a subsidiary in Russia called OpenWay Solutions, to meet Russian government requirements.

On the basis of the initial groundwork, Mir as a system was formalized in 2014 as a way to overcome potential blocks of electronic payments, after several Russian banks were denied services by US-based Visa and MasterCard because of the sanctions regime against them.

The first cards working on the Mir system were launched in December 2015. Sberbank, Russia's leading bank, started issuing them in October 2016. Six months later, in July 2016, McDonald's became the first U.S. company to accept Mir for payment in the Russian Federation.  By the end of 2016, 1.76 million Mir cards had been issued by 64 banks; five years later, by the end of December 2021, over 113.6 million cards were in circulation. In 2020, 3.5 billion payments were issued using Mir, an increase of 75% over the previous year. In March 2021, the payment system announced a ban on the replenishment of foreign electronic wallets, as it considered such operations as high-risk.

2022 financial sanctions and their consequences
In March 2022, as a result of international sanctions during the 2022 Russian invasion of Ukraine, Apple digital wallet services Apple Pay stopped supporting Mir cards.

The 2022 exit of Visa and MasterCard from the Russian market resulted in increased use of the Russian Mir payment system in the Russian Federation and beyond at a time when their combined penetration accounted for 70% of the Russian consumer credit card market. Their cease of operations in Russia represented a 1.5 billion USD annual revenue loss to the two financial services giants. The result was a sharp increase in the number of Mir cards issued. As of April 1, 2022, the number of Mir-compliant cards in circulation exceeded 125 million, an increase of 10.3% from the previous quarter. That sudden and sharp increase in demand created shortage of chips for MIR cards. It is estimated that banks' demand for card chips is six times higher than production capacity of their only domestic manufacturer Mikron Group.

In September 2022, the US Treasury Department threatened foreign banks with secondary sanctions for servicing Mir cards. The department said in a statement: “non-U.S. financial institutions that enter into new or expanded agreements with NSPK risk supporting Russia’s efforts to evade U.S. sanctions through the expanded use of the MIR National Payment System outside the territory of the Russian Federation”. In the following weeks, large banks in a number of countries began to refuse to service Russian cards. Among them were Turkish DenizBank and İşbank, Vietnamese BIDV, Kazakh Halyk Bank, Tajik Dushanbe City. In Uzbekistan, the acceptance of Mir cards was stopped "for technical reasons".

The most serious problem for Russian citizens was the restrictions on servicing the Mir card in Turkey. This is one of the most popular tourist destinations in Russia. The governments of both countries are looking for a replacement for Mir. The Turkish authorities propose to use the Troy national payment system as an alternative.

Operations

Russia
Mir is a state-subsidised payment system, which came into force on 1 May 2017 mandating that all welfare and pension payments be processed by January 2018. Banks were reluctant to issue them, as they feared that their cost might be higher compared to cards belonging to more established payments systems. After the 2022 Russian invasion of the Ukraine, the payment system gained in popularity worldwide for countries seeking to evade sanctions against Russia.

Since October 2022, monetary allowances for servicemen mobilized for the war with Ukraine have been credited to Mir cards.

Acceptance in other countries
As of 27 September 2022, MIR is used in seven countries: 
 Belarus
 Egypt (2022)
 Kazakhstan (2023)
 Kyrgyzstan
 Tajikistan
 Venezuela (2022)
 Cuba (2022)

Countries where Mir was formerly used, but where use has been suspended since 20 September 2022 or earlier:
 Armenia (2018)
 Turkey (2019–2022)
 Uzbekistan (2019–2022)
 Vietnam

The MIR cards can also be used in Abkhazia and South Ossetia since 2019

Before the Russian-Ukrainian War, Bulgaria and Thailand were expected to adapt MIR, according to Central Bank of Russia.  Mir was also being tested in the United Kingdom and in South Korea. In March 2022, Iran was considering recognizing Mir to allow it to continue trading with Russia as due to sanctions over its invasion of Ukraine, Russian banks were banned from the SWIFT system used globally.

According to the TASS news agency, in the summer of 2022, four African countries and one Middle Eastern country considered launching Mir cards: Ethiopia, Nigeria, Tanzania, South Africa and Syria.

India 
In 2021, India and Russia expressed interest in continuing dialogue on accepting RuPay Cards and Mir Cards within national payment infrastructures.

Cuba 
In April 2022, Cuba made the decision to allow Mir cards. Juan Carlos Escalona, ​​tourism advisor to Cuba's embassy in Moscow, indicated that visitors from Russia will be able to pay for services in Cuba with Mir cards once flights resume between both countries.

On 26 July 2022, ATMs in Cuba began to accept Russia's Mir payment cards, Juan Carlos Escalona, adviser to the embassy of the republic on tourism, told the Association of Tour Operators of Russia (ATOR).

Sri Lanka   
In May 2022, Sri Lankan ambassador to Russia Janita Abeivikrema Liyanage said that Sri Lankan authorities are working to ensure that the Mir cards are among the cards that can be used upon arrival in their country. “This issue has been resolved. This year it will work". However in October, the Central bank of Sri Lanka noted that approving Mir in Sri Lanka was impossible due to US sanctions. Instead Sri Lankan and Russian banks signed an agreement which allows Russian tourists to remit money to Sri Lankan banks before arrival by direct transfers between Russian and Sri Lankan banks.

Iran   
On 27 July 2022, Iran will soon start accepting payments made with Russia's Mir bank cards, a top official was quoted by Russia's RIA news agency as saying.

Mongolia 
Banks in Mongolia will soon be able to accept Russian cards from the Mir payment system. 80% of the work is been done. 16 February 2023, TASS.

See also
SPFS

References

External links

  

Payment card services companies
Payment service providers
Financial services companies of Russia
Central Bank of Russia